SpaceNews may refer to:

 SpaceNews, a weekly print and online publication covering the most important news in the space and satellite industry
 SpaceNews (television show), a daily news segment on Canadian television station Space